The Keilor Football Club, nicknamed the Blues, is an Australian rules football club located in Keilor, Victoria, north west of Melbourne. The club originated in 1877, formed at a general meeting at the Waggoner's Arms Hotel. In 1926, the club became a founding member of the Keilor and Broadmeadows Football League, winning premierships in 1926 and 1928. Since 1932, the club has competed in the Essendon District Football League and today fields teams in the Premier Division (seniors), Reserves Premier Division and Women's Premier Division, as well as a number of junior squads.

The club's home games are held at the Keilor Recreation Reserve, which also houses the club's administrative headquarters and is the base for the Keilor Cricket Club.

History
Between 1877 and 1926, the club played a series of exhibition games against various Melbourne sides, including a win against a senior Hotham side that would later place third in the inaugural Victorian Football Association season. In 1926, the club was a founding member of the Keilor and Broadmeadows Football League, winning the inaugural premiership and a second grand final in 1928.

In 1932, the club defected to the Essendon District Football League (EDFL), but had limited success until 1968, winning its first premiership in the B Grade in a side led by player-coach Norm McKenzie. Subsequently, the club was promoted into the A Grade – now the Premier Division – where it has remained since. In 1973, the side won its first A Grade premiership, and also triumphed in first grade grand finals in 1985, 1988, 1995, 1996, 1997, 2000 and 2001.

In 2008, former  and  footballer Mick McGuane was appointed as senior coach. In the 2008 season, the club's A Grade, Reserves and Under-18 sides all featured in their respective grand finals at Windy Hill, with the A Grade taking out the premiership in a 33 points win over Greenvale, who had been undefeated since the 2006 preliminary final. The club's reserves side defeated West Coburg, while the under-18s side were unsuccessful in their match.

With a further reserves team premiership in 2015, both the senior and reserves sides featured in grand finals – now competing in the Premier Division and Reserves Premier Division respectively. In the Premier Division final, Keilor kicked 8 goals to 3 in the opening term to defeat Aberfeldie 13.13 (91) to 9.8 (62) and secure the club's 10th first grade premiership. The reserves side also prevailed, defeating Greenvale 14.8 (92) to 10.9 (69) to win their 11th reserves title.

In 2019, for the first time in the club's history, its Premier Division side achieved both the minor premiership and the premiership, winning 20 games in a row and defeating Aberfeldie 11.9 (75) to 10.7 (67) in the 2019 grand final.

Women's team
In 2017, the club fielded a senior side in the inaugural Western Region and Essendon District Women's Football League season. The Blues dominated the competition, winning all 13 matches and conceding a mere 63 points, before defeating Manor Lakes by 75 points in the grand final. In 2018, the club fielded two women's teams – the EDFL Women's Premier Division side was narrowly defeated by the Sunbury Lions in the Elimination Final, while in the Northern Football League the Blues suffered a 39 point loss to Bendigo. John Tate stepped down from the role of women's coach in February 2019, and was replaced by Ron Sikora.

Honours

VFL/AFL players from Keilor Football Club
 George Spero
 John Ellis
 Mark Harvey
 Ricky Olarenshaw
 Shane Huggard
 Ivan Maric ( & )
 Michael Rischitelli ( & )
 Kyle Hartigan
 James Sicily
 Corey Ellis
 Jayden Laverde
 Paul Ahern ( & )
 Daniel Venables

References

External links

 

Essendon District Football League clubs
1877 establishments in Australia
Australian rules football clubs established in 1877
Australian rules football clubs in Melbourne
Sport in the City of Brimbank